Saidabad (also Romanized as Saʿīdābād; also known as Deh-e Şāḩeb ol Zamān and Deh-e Şāḩeb-e Zamān) is a village in Dust Mohammad Rural District, in the Central District of Hirmand County, Sistan and Baluchestan Province, Iran. At the 2006 census, its population was 436, in 87 families.

References 

Populated places in Hirmand County